Tiger Balm is an analgesic heat rub manufactured and distributed by Singaporean company Haw Par Healthcare. It is used for external pain relief.

History 

A precursor to Tiger Balm called Ban Kin Yu was developed in the 1870s in Rangoon, Burma, during the British colonial era by the practising Chinese herbalist Aw Chu Kin, son of Aw Leng Fan, a Chinese Hakka herbalist in Zhongchuan, Fujian Province, China. His father had sent him to Rangoon in the 1860s to help in his uncle's herbal shop. Eventually, Aw Chu Kin himself set up a family business named Eng Aun Tong ("Hall of Everlasting Peace"). On his deathbed in 1908, he asked his sons Aw Boon Haw and Aw Boon Par to perfect the product. In 1918, the product was renamed "Tiger Balm" in order to gain broader appeal. By 1918, the Aw family had become one of the wealthiest families in Rangoon. By the 1920s, the brothers had turned Eng Aun Tong into a very successful business empire that produced and marketed pharmaceutical products, including the Tiger Balm medicinal ointment. Tiger Balm sold well in Burma, and was exported to China, Japan, and Southeast Asia. 

The brothers moved to Singapore in the 1920s due to problems with the colonial British government. They set up a branch first at Amoy Street then moved to Cecil Street and finally to 89 Neil Road between 1924 and 1926, at the junction of Neil and Craig Road. The Aw family founded the Tiger Balm Gardens in Hong Kong in 1935, Singapore in 1937 and Fujian Province in 1946 to promote the product. Boon Haw also established newspapers in China and Singapore; his daughter said that he spent so much money on advertising that "he thought it would be cheaper to just open a few newspapers".

In 2013, a lawsuit filed by Haw Par against the Indian company Rangoon Chemical Works, asserting that the latter's "Flying Tiger" balm with similar branding infringed on the Tiger Balm trademark, reached the Supreme Court of India. As a result, Rangoon Chemical Works made changes in the branding of its product.

In 2018, there were 10 products being sold under the Tiger Balm brand, in over 100 countries. Tiger Balm generated  in revenues in 2015. The product sold in India is manufactured in Hyderabad by Makson and marketed by Alkem Laboratories. Between 1993 and 2011, it had been manufactured and marketed by Elder Pharmaceuticals.

Composition

The remainder is a petroleum jelly and paraffin base.  The packaging label states that the active ingredients are menthol and camphor.

The original Tiger Balm Red and Tiger Balm White have 25% of camphor. A new product named Tiger Balm White HR uses eucalyptus oil instead of cajuput oil.

See also 
 Amrutanjan (balm)
 Ben-Gay
 Liniment
 IcyHot
 Mentholatum
 Siddhalepa

Explanatory notes

References

External links

 

Ointments
Singaporean brands
Drug brand names
1870s establishments